The Penske PC-6 is a USAC and CART open-wheel race car, designed by British designer Geoff Ferris at Penske Racing, which was constructed for competition in the 1978 season. It also notably successfully won the 1979 Indianapolis 500, being driven by Rick Mears.

References

Racing cars
American Championship racing cars